Francisco Guzman (born 30 March 1967) is a Dominican Republic weightlifter. He competed in the men's middle heavyweight event at the 1988 Summer Olympics.

References

1967 births
Living people
Dominican Republic male weightlifters
Olympic weightlifters of the Dominican Republic
Weightlifters at the 1988 Summer Olympics
Place of birth missing (living people)
20th-century Dominican Republic people